The discography of Belgian singer-songwriter Stromae consists of three studio albums, one extended play, 21 singles and five promotional singles.

His first extended play, Juste un cerveau, un flow, un fond et un mic..., was released in 2007. His second single, "Up Saw Liz", was released in 2009. His second mixtape, Mixture Elecstro was released in 2010. "Alors on danse" was released on 26 September 2009 as the lead single from his debut studio album. The song became a huge international success reaching number one in 14 countries including Austria, Belgium, Denmark, France, Italy, the Netherlands and Switzerland.

His debut studio album, Cheese, was released on 14 June 2010. "Te Quiero" was released as the second single from the album, peaking at number 4 in Belgium. "House'llelujah" was released as the third single from the album peaking to number 22 in Belgium.

In 2013, his second album Racine carrée was released. The three singles from the album reached the number 1 position both in France and Belgium, even occupying the two first places in his home country. Stromae released his third album, Multitude in 2022.

Albums

Studio albums

Mixtapes

Video albums

Compilation albums

Extended plays

Singles

As lead artist

As featured artist

Promotional singles

Other songs

As featured artist

Charted songs

Songwriting and production credits

Music videos

As lead artist

Notes

References

External links
  

Discographies of Belgian artists
Electronic music discographies
Hip hop discographies
discography